"Vox Humana" is a Kenny Loggins song from his 1985 album, Vox Humana. It was released as the leading single from the album, and peaked at No. 29 on Billboard Hot 100. This song represents Loggins' musical experiment with synthpop. This is also the first song by Loggins after Footloose and is one of the first songs produced by himself.

Credits adapted from the album's liner notes.

The music video features artist Robert Campbell, who was the scenic painter, playing himself.

Charts

References

1985 songs
1985 singles
Kenny Loggins songs
Songs written by Kenny Loggins
Columbia Records singles